The South African music scene includes both popular (jive) and folk forms like Zulu isicathamiya singing and harmonic mbaqanga. Other popular genres are Marabi, Kwaito, house music, Isicathamiya, Gqom, rock music, hip hop and Amapiano.

Among the most prominent South African singers are Miriam Makeba, Brenda Fassie, Hugh Masekela, Yvonne Chaka Chaka and Lucky Dube.

Pre-20th-century history 
Early records of music in southern Africa indicate a fusion of cultural traditions: African, European and Asian.

Modern country's early musician Enoch Sontonga wrote the Southern African national anthem Nkosi Sikelel' iAfrika in 1897. By the end of the nineteenth century, South African cities such as Cape Town were large enough to attract foreign musicians, especially American ragtime players. In the 1890s Orpheus McAdoo's Jubilee Singers popularised African-American spirituals.

Marabi

The discovery of gold, diamonds and other minerals in South Africa during the late 1800s and early 1990s lead to a rapid urbanization where natives would leave their villages and move to the city/town so that they could work in the mines to earn a living. However due to the Natives Land Act, 1913, black people were not allowed to own property even in the city, leading to slums (at that time, townships did not exist yet as they were created during Apartheid which began in 1948) where they could live.

In these slums, shebeens were established even though they were illegal. These shebeens would provide a nightlife for people living in these slums including mineworkers. At that time, jazz was the most popular style of music in the urban areas of South Africa, especially in these shebeens. So, jazz got fused with African traditional music creating a new style of music called "Marabi". By the end of the 1920s, Marabi music had become wildly popular in the shebeens, but it had also gained a sordid reputation.  Drug dealers, criminals, and prostitution are frequently associated with marabi music and marabi, already looked down upon by White South Africans, was now shunned by the educated Black classes of South Africans as well.  Despite this, it continued to thrive in the townships around Johannesburg and other major cities.

It created many stars such as Miriam Makeba, Dolly Rathebe, Hugh Masekela and Abdullah Ibrahim that became very influential in the South African music scene.

Gospel

Christianity in South Africa was first introduced during the 1600s when Christian missionaries began arriving from the Netherlands. Missionaries from the United Kingdom, France, Germany, Scandinavia and the United States arrived from the early 1800s. Churches and missionary schools were built throughout the country. Native South Africans who were converted into Christianity were taught hymns that were sung in Europe and the USA. Newly converted Christians would eventually compose new hymns in their own African languages. An example would be Enoch Sontonga, who composed Nkosi Sikelel' iAfrika.

In the early twentieth century, Zionist Christian churches spread across South Africa. They incorporated African musical elements into their gospel songs. Modern gospel artists include Rebecca Malope and Lundi Tyamara.

Classical and art music
Classical and art music in South Africa reached its zenith of popularity in the mid-20th century and was primarily composed by a triumvirate of Afrikaner composers known as the "fathers of South African art music." These composers were Arnold van Wyk, Hubert du Plessis, and Stefans Grové. All three composers were White South Africans, yet harbored very different views on Apartheid, which was state policy at the time. Stefans Grové was one of the first white composers to incorporate Black African music into his compositions, and openly rejected apartheid ideals in an effort to fuse his "Western art and his physical, African space." Arnold Van Wyk became known for his government-endorsed nationalistic compositions, though he himself was reluctant to support the apartheid administration. Hubert Du Plessis, on the other hand, was a very strong Afrikaner nationalist, and experienced a "growing consciousness" of his heritage which made him proud to compose such pieces. Du Plessis' works included chamber music, orchestral pieces, and many pieces for the piano.

Afrikaans music
Afrikaans music was primarily influenced by Dutch folk styles, along with French and German influences, in the early twentieth century. Zydeco-type string bands led by a concertina were popular, as were elements of American country music, especially Jim Reeves. The most prolific composers of "tiekie draai" Afrikaans music were lyricist Anton De Waal who wrote many hit songs with songwriters, pianist Charles Segal ("Hey Babariebab Se Ding Is Vim", "Kalkoenjie", "Sy Kom Van Kommetjie" and many others) and accordionist, Nico Carstens. Bushveld music based on the Zulu were reinterpreted by such singers as Marais and Miranda. Melodramatic and sentimental songs called trane trekkers (tearjerkers) were especially common. In 1973, a country music song won the coveted SARI Award (South African Music Industry) for the Song of the Year – "My Children, My Wife" was written by renowned South African composer Charles Segal and lyricist Arthur Roos. In 1979 the South African Music scene changed from the Tranetrekkers to more lively sounds and the introduction of new names in the market with the likes of Anton Goosen, David Kramer (singer), Koos du Plessis, Fanie de Jager, Flaming Victory and Laurika Rauch. Afrikaans music is currently one of the most popular and best selling industries on the South African music scene. 

After World War I, Afrikaner nationalism spread and such musicians as Jewish pianist and composer Charles Segal and accordionist Nico Carstens were popular.

The 1930s

A cappella

The 1930s saw the spread of Zulu a cappella singing from the Natal area to much of South Africa. The style's popularity, finally producing a major star in 1939 with Solomon Linda's Original Evening Birds, whose "Mbube" ("The Lion") was probably the first African recording to sell more than 100,000 copies. It also provided the basis for two further American pop hits, The Weavers' "Wimoweh" (1951) and The Tokens' "The Lion Sleeps Tonight" (1961). Linda's music was in a style that came to be known as mbube. From the late 1940s to the 1960s, a harsh, strident form called isikhwela jo was popular, though national interest waned in the 1950s until Radio Zulu began broadcasting to Natal, Transvaal and the Orange Free State in 1962 (see 1950s: Bantu Radio and pennywhistle for more details).

Also formed in this era was the Stellenbosch University Choir, part of the University of Stellenbosch, the oldest running choir in the country and was formed in 1936 by William Morris, also the first conductor of the Choir. The current conductor is Andre van der Merwe. They specialise in a cappella music and consist of students from the University.

The 1950s

Bantu Radio and the music industry
By the 1950s, the music industry had diversified greatly, and included several major labels. Innovative musician and composer, Charles Segal was the first white musician to work with the indigenous African people, recording tribal performers and promoting African music overseas starting in the 1950s. Charles Segal was also the first white musician to write in the indigenous African style and to bring the African music genre into the commercial market. His single "Africa" was a hit amongst the diverse South African population in the 1960s and he continued to produce, record and teach his own unique style of African music, which was a mix of African and Jazz influences. These compositions include "Opus Africa", "African Fantasy", "Kootanda" and many more. In 1962, the South African government launched a development programme for Bantu Radio in order to foster separate development and encourage independence for the Bantustans. Though the government had expected Bantu Radio to play folk music, African music had developed into numerous pop genres, and the nascent recording studios used radio to push their pop stars. The new focus on radio led to a government crackdown on lyrics, censoring songs which were considered a "public hazard".

Pennywhistle jive
The first major style of South African popular music to emerge was pennywhistle jive (later known as kwela). Black cattle-herders had long played a three-holed reed flute, adopting a six-holed flute when they moved to the cities. Willard Cele is usually credited with creating pennywhistle by placing the six-holed flute between his teeth at an angle. Cele spawned a legion of imitators and fans, especially after appearing in the 1951 film The Magic Garden (film).

Groups of flautists played on the streets of South African cities in the 1950s, many of them in white areas, where police would arrest them for creating a public disturbance. Some young whites were attracted to the music, and came to be known as ducktails. The 1950s also saw 'coloured' bands develop the new genre of Quela, a hybrid of South African Squares and modern samba. Once again, we see the cross-over between white, Afrikaans music and the indigenous South Africa music in the compositions of pianist and composer, Charles Segal, with his penny whistle hits including "Kwela Kwela" and many others.

The 1960s
In the 1960s, a smooth form of mbube called cothoza mfana developed, led by the King Star Brothers, who invented isicathamiya style by the end of the decade.

By the 1960s, the saxophone was commonplace in jive music, the performance of which continued to be restricted to townships. The genre was called sax jive and later mbaqanga. Mbaqanga literally means dumpling but implies home-made and was coined by Michael Xaba, a jazz saxophonist who did not like the new style.

The early 1960s also saw performers such as bassist Joseph Makwela and guitarist Marks Mankwane add electric instruments and marabi and kwela influences to the mbaqanga style, leading to a funkier and more African sound.

Mbaqanga developed vocal harmonies during the very early 1960s when groups including The Skylarks and the Manhattan Brothers began copying American vocal bands, mostly doo wop. Rather than African-American four-part harmonies, however, South African bands used five parts. The Dark City Sisters were the most popular vocal group in the early 1960s, known for their sweet style. Aaron Jack Lerole of Black Mambazo added groaning male vocals to the female harmonies, later being replaced by Simon 'Mahlathini' Nkabinde, who has become perhaps the most influential and well-known South African "groaner" of the twentieth century. Marks Mankwane and Joseph Makwela's mbaqanga innovations evolved into the more danceable mgqashiyo sound when the two joined forces with Mahlathini and the new female group Mahotella Queens, in Mankwane's backing group Makhona Tsohle Band (also featuring Makwela along with saxophonist-turned-producer West Nkosi, rhythm guitarist Vivian Ngubane, and drummer Lucky Monama). The Mahlathini and the Mahotella Queens/Makhona Tsohle outfit recorded as a studio unit for Gallo Record Company, to great national success, pioneering mgqashiyo music all over the country to equal success.

In 1967 Miriam Makeba released US hit "Pata Pata". 1967, Izintombi Zesi Manje Manje, an mgqashiyo female group that provided intense competition for Mahotella Queens. Both groups were massive competitors in the jive field, though the Queens usually came out on top.

Soul and jazz
The late 1960s saw the rise of soul music from the United States. Wilson Pickett and Percy Sledge were among singers who were especially popular and inspired South African performers to enter the field with an organ, a bass-and-drum rhythm section and an electric guitar.

In the 1960s jazz split into two fields. Dance bands like the Elite Swingsters were popular, while avant-garde jazz inspired by the work of John Coltrane, Thelonious Monk and Sonny Rollins was also common. The latter field of musicians included prominent activists and thinkers, including Hugh Masekela, Abdullah Ibrahim (formerly known as 'Dollar Brand'), Kippie Moeketsi, Sathima Bea Benjamin, Chris McGregor, Johnny Dyani and Jonas Gwangwa. In 1959, American pianist John Mehegan organised a recording session using many of the most prominent South African jazz musicians, resulting in the first two African jazz LPs. The following year saw the Cold Castle National Jazz Festival, which brought additional attention to South African jazz. Cold Castle became an annual event for a few years, and brought out more musicians, especially Dudu Pukwana, Gideon Nxumalo and Chris McGregor. The 1963 festival produced an LP called Jazz The African Sound, but government oppression soon ended the jazz scene. Again, many musicians emigrated or went into exile in the UK or other countries.

In 1968 Hugh Masekela got big hit "Grazing in the Grass", and it reached No.1 on Billboard pop chart. While the African jazz of the north of South Africa was being promoted in Johannesburg, musicians in Cape Town were awakening to their jazz heritage. Pianist Charles Segal, who had moved from Pretoria to Cape Town, brought an enthusiasm for jazz after several trips to the US, where he met and was influenced by the jazz pianist Oscar Peterson. The port city had a long history of musical interaction with seafaring players. The rise of the Coon Carnival and the visionary talent of Abdullah Ibrahim (Dollar Brand) and his sax players Basil Coetzee and Robbie Jansen led to Cape Jazz. It was an improvised version of their folk songs with musical reference to European and American jazz which would go on some 20 years later to be South Africa's most important jazz export.

The 1970s

Mgqashiyo and Isicathamiya
By the 1970s, only a few long-standing mgqashiyo groups were well-known, with the only new groups finding success with an all-male line-up. Abafana Baseqhudeni and Boyoyo Boys were perhaps the biggest new stars of this period. The Mahotella Queens' members began leaving the line-up around 1971 for rival groups. Gallo, by far the biggest record company in South Africa, began to create a new Mahotella Queens line-up, recording them with Abafana Baseqhudeni. Lead groaner Mahlathini had already moved to rival label EMI (in early 1972), where he had successful records with backing team Ndlondlo Bashise and new female group the Mahlathini Girls. The new Mahotella Queens line-up over at Gallo found just as much success as the original Queens, recording on-and-off with new male groaners such as Robert Mbazo Mkhize of Abafana Baseqhudeni.

Ladysmith Black Mambazo, headed by the sweet soprano of Joseph Shabalala, arose in the 1960s, and became perhaps the biggest isicathamiya stars in South Africa's history. Their first album was 1973's Amabutho, which was also the first gold record by black musicians; it sold over 25,000 copies. Ladysmith Black Mambazo remained popular throughout the next few decades, especially after 1986, when Paul Simon, an American musician, included Ladysmith Black Mambazo on his extremely popular Graceland album and its subsequent tour of 1987.

With progressive jazz hindered by governmental suppression, marabi-styled dance bands rose to more critical prominence in the jazz world. The music became more complex and retained popularity, while progressive jazz produced only occasional hits, such as Winston Ngozi's "Yakal Nkomo" and Abdullah Ibrahim's "Mannenberg".

Punk rock
During the punk rock boom of the late 1970s, UK and American punk music influenced South African bands, such as Wild Youth and Powerage and gained a cult following, focused in Durban and in and around Johannesburg. Bands such as Dog Detachment and The Radio Rats and Young Dumb & Violent had a similar following on the fringes of the music scene. Cape Town had a big following with Safari Suits, Housewife's Choice, The Lancaster Band, The News and Permanent Force (aka Private File after BOSS intervention), soon followed by The Rude Dementals, The Zero's, Fred Smith Band, Red Army, Riot Squad, Injury Time and The Vipers. In Cape Town many gigs took place at "Scratch" Club (run by Gerry Dixon and Henry Coombes), 1886, UCT, Off The Road, numerous town halls and other local venues. Some of the aforementioned bands passed through on tours. The "RIOT ROCK" tour of December 1979 being a culmination of the period. National Wake was a multiracial punk rock band in the late 1970s. They were created in protest of the apartheid regime. They were South Africa's first multiracial punk band.

Disco
In the middle of the 1970s, American disco was imported to South Africa, and disco beats were added to soul music, which helped bring a halt to popular mbaqanga bands such as the Mahotella Queens. In 1976, South African children rebelled en masse against apartheid and governmental authority, and a vibrant, youthful counterculture was created, with music as an integral part of its focus. Styles from before the 1970s fusion of disco and soul were not widely regarded, and were perceived as being sanctioned by the white oppressors. Few South African bands gained a lasting success during this period, however, with the exception of the Movers, who used marabi elements in their soul. The Movers were followed by the Soul Brothers, and the instrumental band The Cannibals, who soon began working with singer Jacob "Mpharanyana" Radebe. The coloured (not black) band The Flames also gained a following, and soon contributed two members (Blondie Chaplin and Ricky Fataar) to American band The Beach Boys. Harari arose in their place, eventually moving to an almost entirely rock and roll sound. One of Harare's members, Sipho 'Hotstix' Mabuse became a superstar in the 1980s.

Rock
There was a thriving, mostly white, rock music scene in Cape Town in the 1970s. The album McCully Workshop Inc. from the psychedelic rock band McCully Workshop is a good example the genre on Trutone Records. The Trutone label was owned by South African company Gallo (Africa) Limited an internationally recognised music producer.

The 1980s

Alternative rock and Afrikaans
The early 1980s brought popular attention on alternative rock bands such as The Usual and Scooter's Union. In and around Johannesburg the growth of the independent music scene led to not just a surge of bands ranging from big names (relatively speaking) Tribe After Tribe, The Dynamics, The Softies and the Spectres through to smaller hopefuls What Colours, Days Before and No Exit, but also to the growth of a vibrant DIY fanzine scene with "Palladium" and "One Page to Many" two titles of note.

South African alternative rock grew more mainstream with two leading bands, Asylum Kids from Johannesburg and Peach from Durban having chart success and releasing critically acclaimed albums. The burgeoning music scene around Johannesburg saw a surge of small bands, inspired and informed by the UK DIY punk ethic, form and start performing at a growing number of venues from clubs the likes of Metalbeat, Bluebeat, King of Clubs, DV8 and Dirtbox to student run venues such as GR Bozzoli Hall and later the Free People Concert on the University of the Witwatersrand campus.

One artist of specific note to come from this era was James Phillips who was involved with several influential and important bands including Corporal Punishment; Cherry Faced Lurchers; and his Afrikaans alter ego Bernoldus Niemand (roughly translates as Bernard Nobody). With his Bernoldus Niemand character, James managed to cross the language division and influence a whole range of Afrikaans speaking musicians to the same punk ethic that had inspired him, and an important Afrikaans alternative rock scene grew from this influence.

During this period, the only Afrikaners to achieve much mainstream fame were Anton Goosen, a rock singer-songwriter, and Bles Bridges, an imitator of American lounge singer Wayne Newton.

Gothic rock
In 1983, Dog Detachment was one of the earliest groups which combined Post-Punk music with elements of Gothic rock. South Africa's first Gothic rock band was No Friends of Harry, formed in the mid-1980s. Other notable bands from the second half of the 1980s are The Gathering (not to be confused with the Dutch Metal band), The Death Flowers of No-cypher, Lidice, The Attic Muse, The Autumn Ritual, The Elephant Celebes and Penguins in Bondage.

In 1995, The Awakening was formed by vocalist, guitarist and producer Ashton Nyte. The band is credited in major national press as "South Africa's most successful Gothic Rock act and one of the top bands in the far broader Alternative scene" and headlined major national festivals throughout South Africa, including the country's largest music festival Woodstock, in addition to Oppikoppi and RAMFest. With more than a dozen top ten national singles between 1998 and 2007, The Awakening were the first goth-styled act to have major success in South Africa.

Another notable goth artist was The Eternal Chapter, which had a hit with the cover "Here comes the man", originally by Boom Boom Room.

Pop 
P J Powers won the 1986 Song for South Africa competition, the first one run by the SABC. It aimed to promote South African music. The winning song was Don Clarke's Sanbonani.  The final round was televised on national TV, with P J Powers supported by her band, Hotline. Sanbonani featured on the P J Powers and Hotline Greatest Hits album in 1991.

International attention
The original Mahotella Queens line-up reunited with Mahlathini and the Makgona Tsohle Band in 1983, due to unexpected demand from mgqashiyo and mbaqanga fans. Ladysmith Black Mambazo took their first step into the international arena via Paul Simon on his Graceland album in 1986, where a series of reissue albums by US label Shanachie sold very well. Mambazo became world travellers, touring the world and collaborating with various Western musicians to massive success. "Graceland" won many awards including the Grammy Award for Best Album of the Year. A year later, Simon produced Black Mambazo's first U.S. release, Shaka Zulu, which won the Grammy Award, in 1988, for Best Traditional Folk Album. Since then, and in total, the group has received fifteen Grammy Award Nominations and three Grammy Award wins, including one in 2009. The Graceland album not only propelled Mambazo into the spotlight, but paved the way for other South African acts (including Mahlathini and the Queens, Amaswazi Emvelo, Moses Mchunu, Ray Phiri and Stimela, The Mighty Soul beat and others) to become known worldwide as well.

World in Union, the Ladysmith Black Mambazo record feat. P J Powers, became an international hit record in 1995. It charted in the UK (no 47 on the singles charts).

Johnny Clegg got his start in the 1970s playing Zulu-traditional music with Sipho Mchunu, and became prominent as the only major white musician playing traditional black music, achieving success in France as "Le Zoulou Blanc" (The White Zulu). The 1980s also saw a resurgence in rock and roll bands, among them The Helicopters, Petit Cheval, Sterling and Tellinger.

Mango Groove has racked up a host of achievements throughout the years, and has firmly established itself as one of South Africa’s most recognised and loved music icons. The group exploded into the national consciousness with the release of its 10 times Platinum debut album in 1989. Taking SA music to the world: Amongst other things, this included Mango Groove being the only South African act invited to perform at the 1997 handover of Hong Kong to China, being the only South African act featured on The Freddie Mercury Tribute concert (broadcast to over a billion people), appearing in front of 200 000 people at the SOS Racisme concert in Paris and receiving 3 encores at the Montrieux Jazz Festival.

Reggae 
The most lasting change, however, may have been the importation of reggae from Jamaica. Following international superstar Bob Marley's concert celebrating Zimbabwe's independence in 1980, reggae took hold across Africa. Lucky Dube was the first major South African artists; his style was modelled most closely on that of Peter Tosh. Into the 1990s, Lucky Dube was one of the best-selling artists in South African history, especially his 1990 album Slave. The 1990s also saw Jamaican music move towards ragga, an electronic style that was more influential on kwaito (South African hip hop music) than reggae.
A group from the Free State called Oyaba also emerged during this period. Their best known hit songs are Tomorrow Nation, Paradise and Love Crazy. Reggae became quite popular and there was also a singer from KwaZulu-Natal, Sipho Johnson known as Jambo.

Bubblegum
Bubblegum was a form of pure South African pop music that arose in the middle of the 1980s, distinctively based on vocals with overlapping call-and-response vocals. Electronic keyboards and synthesisers were commonplace. Dan Tshanda of the band Splash was the first major bubblegum star, followed by Chicco Twala. Twala introduced some politically oriented lyrics, such as "We Miss You Manelo" (a coded tribute to Nelson Mandela) and "Papa Stop the War", a collaboration with Mzwakhe Mbuli.

In 1983 a major new South African star was born, Brenda Fassie. Her single, "Weekend Special", announced her as the pre-eminent female South African vocalist of her generation. She remained unmatched in popularity, talent until her untimely death in 2004.

The late 1980s saw the rise of Yvonne Chaka Chaka, beginning with her 1984 hit "I'm in Love With a DJ", which was the first major hit for bubblegum. Her popularity rose into the 1990s, especially across the rest of Africa and into Europe. Jabu Khanyile's Bayete and teen heart-throb Ringo have also become very popular.

The Voëlvry movement

Afrikaans-language music saw a resurgence in the 1980s as the Voëlvry ("free as a bird" or "outlawed") movement reflected a new Afrikaans artistic counter-culture largely hostile to the values of the National Party and conservative Afrikanerdom. Spearheaded by the singer-songwriter Johannes Kerkorrel and his Gereformeerde Blues Band, the movement (which was named after Kerkorrel's 1989 regional tour) also included musicians Bernoldus Niemand (aka James Phillips) and Koos Kombuis. Voëlvry tapped into a growing dissatisfaction with the Apartheid system amongst white Afrikaans speakers, and thus Voëlvry represents the musical branch of opposition that was paralleled by literature and the arts.

The 1990s

New rhythms
In 1994, South African media was liberalised and new musical styles arose. Prophets of Da City became known as a premier hip hop crew, though a South Africanised style of hip hop known as kwaito soon replaced actual hip hop groups. In kwaito, synthesisers and other electronic instruments are common, and slow jams adopted from Chicago house musicians like The Fingers, Tony Humphries and Robert Owen are also standard. Stars of kwaito include Trompies, Bongo Maffin, TKZee, Mandoza and Boom Shaka. The band Tree63 also emerged, first known for their hit single, "A Million Lights" and then further popularised by their version of Matt Redman's "Blessed Be Your Name".

Gospel
The biggest star of 1990s gospel was Rebecca Malope, whose 1995 album Shwele Baba was extremely popular. Malope continues to record, in addition to performers such as Lusanda Spiritual Group, Barorisi Ba Morena, Amadodana Ase Wesile, Vuyo Mokoena and International Pentacoastal Church Choir, Rayreed Soul Beat, Lundi, Joyous Celebration, and Scent From Above who have performed in Botswana occasionally. In 2000s Vuyo Mooena has emerged as the best selling Gospel artist. His albums have been audited to be in Top 5 selling in the country. In his album he sang in all South African languages like Venda, Shangaan, Sotho, Zulu and Xhosa. The industry has also been joined by the likes of Hlengiwe Mhlaba (whose Aphendule is popular) and Solly Moholo. Also we see the new singers like Oleseng Shuping become popular and he won the king of gospel award.

Afrikaans music
Prof Piet de Villiers was the front runner prior to 1994 with his compositions of Boerneef.

The period after 1994 saw a dramatic growth in the popularity of Afrikaans music. Numerous new young Afrikaans singers (soloists and groups) released CDs and DVDs and attracted large audiences at "kunstefeeste" (art festivals) such as the "Klein Karoo Nasionale Kunstefees – KKNK" in Oudtshoorn, "Aardklop" in Potchefstroom and "Innibos" in Nelspruit.

Apart from dozens of new songs being introduced into the Afrikaans music market, it became popular for modern young artists to sing old Afrikaans songs on a stage or in a pub, with crowds of young admirers singing along. The reason for the dramatic increase in the popularity of Afrikaans music can be speculated about. One theory is that the end of Apartheid in 1994 also meant the end of the privileged position that the Afrikaans culture had in South Africa. After losing the privileged protection and promotion of the language and the culture by the State, the Afrikaans-speaking community seems to have spontaneously started embracing and developing their language and culture. This was due to pop artists like Steve Hofmeyr, Nádine, Kurt Darren, and Nicolis Louw bringing a new fresh sound in Afrikaans Music. Many of the songs sung and/or written by these artists are similar in sound to Euro dance music. Critics would claim that all an Afrikaans pop artist needs for a song to be popular is a catchy tune and an easy beat. This is due to the massive popularity of a form of couples dancing called "langarm" or "sokkie". The dance halls where this takes place could be considered as night clubs but they play almost exclusively Afrikaans pop music. The Afrikaans pop music market therefore generates tremendous demand for new material.

Alternative
The 1990s could be seen as the genesis of a vibrant alternative music scene in South Africa. The Voëlvry movement was a major influence in establishing the scene, but subject material markedly shifted from protest to the more abstract and personal. Major festivals like Oppikoppi and Woodstock were started and grew steadily, firmly cementing the niche under predominantly white university students exploring a newfound intellectual independence after the fall of apartheid. The first band to reach any major recognition was Springbok Nude Girls established in 1994. Other notable acts established in this decade were The Outsiders (est. 1991), Nine (est. 1992), Fetish (est. 1996), Wonderboom (est. 1996), Boo! (est. 1997), The Awakening (est. 1996), Henry Ate, Just Jinger (est. 1996), Fuzigish and Battery 9.

Metal
In the early and mid-1980s there were bands like Black Rose, Stretch, Razor, Lynx, Pentagon, Montreaux, Unchained and Osiris. Then came the new breed of South African metal with a band called Ragnärok, South Africa's first thrash metal band, formed by Dean G Smith who were labelled as South Africa's Metallica and the only metal band at that time to have a cult following. They formed in South Johannesburg in 1986 playing covers for a short while and then moving on to original music only. Through the late 1980s and into the early 1990s, South Africa grew a well supported metal scene, marked by the release of Johannesburg-based Odysseys' self-titled album in 1991. There was a burgeoning crossover punk/metal scene in the major centres, particularly spurred on by Cape Towns' Voice of Destruction and Johannesburg based Urban Assault in the very late 1980s. Johannesburg developed an extreme metal scene in 1992 with rising grindcore/death metal act Retribution Denied, Boksburg based macabre/death metal act Debauchery followed by Pretoria doom metal band Funeral, Christian metal act Abhorrence and Insurrection, Metalmorphosis, Sacrifist and Agro, the latter two acts still perform today. The Cape Town metal scene was on a high in the mid-1990s, driven largely by Pothole and Sacraphyx. Pothole would release two critically acclaimed albums on South Africa's most successful punk/metal label, Way-Cool Records – their debut "Force-Fed Hatred" is still the top selling South African metal album to date. Whilst many of the acts failed to find commercial success in terms of CD sales, there was a devout following nationally and local metal bands soon opened the national touring circuit to a higher extent than most other genres. It also attracted international artists to tour the country almost immediately after the demise of apartheid, with some of the most respected international artists having seen fit to visit the country since.

Techno
The first South African live techno band was Kraftreaktor. Amoraim and Gareth Hinde are from Kraftreaktor and performed at several raves, playing mainly techno-trance music with guest musicians sometimes. Their music was influenced by themselves, but included a unique South African touch. They sometimes integrated African sounds and ethnomusicologist, Gavin Coppenhall.

The 2000s

Blues Rock
The Blues Rock scene has dramatically emerged in South Africa. Albert Frost, Dan Patlansky, The Black Cat Bones, Gerald Clark, Crimson House Blues, The Blues Broers and Boulevard Blues band are some of the most prominent blues acts in South-Africa. Figures like Piet Botha and Valiant Swart have largely contributed to the South-African Blues and Rock scene.

Kwaito

Kwaito is based on house music beats, but typically at a slower tempo and containing melodic and percussive African samples which are looped, deep bass-lines and often vocals, generally male, shouted or chanted rather than sung or rapped. Many consider it South Africa's unique implementation of hip hop.

Afrikaans

In a resurgence (an increase or revival after a period of little activity, popularity, or occurrence) that has been linked by some to freedom from Apartheid guilt, Afrikaans music saw a surge in new artists, album releases and sales after 2000. In 2004 an Afrikaans album (by balladeer Steve Hofmeyr) was named best-selling album of the year.

In 2007 an Afrikaans song about Boer War general Koos de la Rey by Bok van Blerk became a hit amid debates on whether it represented a call to arms for the reinstatement of Afrikaner rule or just expressed cultural nostalgia.

While the boom in the Afrikaans pop industry has continued from the previous decade through the popularity of arts festivals and dance halls, other Afrikaans music genres experienced a revival of sorts in the new millennium. Rock and alternative Afrikaans music had stagnated somewhat after the heady days of the "Voëlvry" tour and the alternative movement. Signs of a revival could be found in the arrival of Karen Zoid on the music scene due to her distinct alternative sound.

Shortly afterwards, a band of young rockers called "Fokofpolisiekar" became the first group to create alternative rock in Afrikaans. Their controversial name (translated as Fuckoffpolicecar), statements and behavior drew much public attention, making them a symbol of the Afrikaans Rock revival movement. Lead singer Francois Van Coke and songwriter Hunter Kennedy have gone on to explore other genres of music also not previously popular in Afrikaans and have ventured into more commercial routes.

Shortly after the arrival of this and other rock acts, the first Afrikaans television music channel (MK89) was opened which focused mainly on rock music. The Afrikaans (and English) rock and alternative music scene has been booming ever since. Bands like Battery9, Terminatrix, NuL, K.O.B.U.S. and Thys Nywerheid continue to reinvent alternative Afrikaans music, while Jack Parow has continued the Cape's development of Afrikaans rap from pioneers Brasse vannie Kaap, finding success as far afield as Holland with his 2009 single "Cooler as Ekke".

2009 Breakthrough Experimentalism
From 2009 into 2010, two unique and eclectic but thoroughly South African groups in particular received high acclaim from international music media, and both groups challenged traditional genre descriptions. They significantly increased global recognition of contemporary South African music culture.

BLK JKS' experimental Afro-rock took inspiration from The Mars Volta to blend their Zulu heritage and township origins with modern sounds and equipment and an approach to music-making that seems entirely devoid of boundaries, while maintaining the sweet melodies and rhythmic qualities of South Africa's traditional music. They received an important boost after performing in Opening Ceremony of 2010 FIFA World Cup.

Die Antwoord has challenged conventions of hip-hop through its blend of English, Afrikaans, and local slang, and sparse House-influenced production, reflecting the new 'Zef' counter-culture in its cheap-and-dirty values. The band achieved worldwide attention with their self-published debut thanks to two striking and humorous YouTube music videos released in 2010 that rapidly reached viral proportions. The highly polarised international response to their music helped them secure an album deal with Cherrytree Records, an imprint of Interscope. They also famously triggered a feud with American pop singer Lady Gaga, who offered them the chance to open for her on her Born This Way Tour, which they blatantly refused.

In 2016, singer Refentse Morake made waves for releasing his debut album solely in Afrikaans, becoming the first black singer to do so.

Drum and bass
The South African drum and bass scene began in the mid nineties. In 2000, events such as Homegrown became a prominent fixture in Cape Town and a launching platform for international and local artists such as Counterstrike, SFR, Niskerone, Tasha Baxter, Anti Alias and Rudeone. Other regular events include It Came From The Jungle in Cape Town and Science Friksun in Johannesburg.

A weekly Sublime drum and bass radio show is hosted by Hyphen on Bush Radio.

Psychedelic trance
South African psytrance is a form of darker psychedelic trance music that started and is produced mostly in South Africa. Unlike the Russian dark psytrance, South African psytrance is more rhythmic, melodic and danceable, yet keeps the 'nasty-like' attitude. Notable record labels include Timecode Records, Mind Manipulation Device and Nano Records.

Modern day
The South African music scene has continued to flourish in the 2000s. The decade has seen the rise of Xhosa singer Simphiwe Dana, whose success has seen her hailed as the "new Miriam Makeba", with her unique combination of jazz, pop, and traditional music. Another similar young singer is Thandiswa Mazwai, originally a kwaito singer with Bongo Maffin. Thandiswa combined local hip-hop rhythms with traditional Xhosa sounds, creating a rich textured style. 2006 saw the rise of Shwi Nomtekhala, a duo combining mbaqanga rhythms and maskandi sounds. The duo has become one of the most influential new acts on the music scene today, outselling even kwaito artists. Their third album Wangisiza Baba was a major hit in the country. Cape Town-based female artist Verity has been recognised internationally for innovation in the music industry for selling 2000 copies of her album Journey before it was actually recorded. Rap group "2 and a Half Secondz" has found recognition in Cape Town suburb, Delft since 2009. Cape Town based band Crimson House Blues has made waves throughout the live circuit being hailed as one of the greatest live acts in the country. In addition Willim Welsyn, part of the Afrikaans rock band Willim Welsyn en Sunrise Toffies was nominated and won multiple awards in the Afrikaans Alternative categories.

Nianell, the South African superstar, is also another internationally recognised artist in modern South African music, combing Folk, Classical, Pop, Country, and Celtic music that make her own unique sound. She has released seven albums with songs that switch back and forth between Afrikaans and English. Her first platinum hit that sold more than 2 million copies was "Who Painted The Moon" that was also covered by international superstar Hayley Westenra. In early 2011, she made her initial debut in the U.S. with her compilation album Who Painted The Moon.

Ladysmith Black Mambazo remain one of the world's most popular choral groups and still retain popularity in South Africa, with their latest offering being the highly praised Ilembe (2007/2008). The legendary group boasts three grammy wins. The Mahotella Queens also remain high-selling, and – with the death of long-time groaner Mahlathini in 1999 – have recorded several new albums, including their 2007 release Siyadumisa (Songs of Praise). 2008 has also seen the return of a former singer with the Mahotella Queens, Irene Mawela. Mawela appeared on thousands of mbaqanga and mgqashiyo recording sessions well throughout the 1960s and the 1970s, recording mainly for Gallo Record Company, often as part of the line-ups of the Mahotella Queens, the Mgababa Queens, Izintombi Zomgqashiyo, and also under her own name (though sometimes as Irene & The Sweet Melodians, or Irene & The Zebra Queens). In 1983 she left the company to record as a solo artist, with a successful Venda-traditional release Khanani Yanga. Mawela left the music business in the late 1980s, but returned in November 2007 with a brand-new album called Tlhokomela Sera, which combines modern contemporary sounds with pure gospel music, making what Mawela calls "gospel jive".

The music scene in South Africa is focused around four major areas, Johannesburg, Cape Town, Durban and Bloemfontein. One of the characteristics of the scene is the strong sense of community which sees artist, promoters and venues all actively involved in developing the local talent. Bloemfontein's music focus is centred predominantly around the metal and Afrikaans genres. Johannesburg, Cape Town and Durban are far more wide-ranging in the genres of music covered by bands and artists. Cape Town is a hotbed for the underground music scene, generally held to be more experimental than the music produced in the other centres. Potchefstroom seems to be the newest development ground for Afrikaans rock music, with various bands like Straatligkinders making their start here.

The introduction of the South African Music Awards (SAMA), intended to recognise accomplishment in the South African recording industry has raised the awareness of local artists and bands. The awards are given in various categories, including album of the year, best newcomer, best artists (male and female) and the best duo or group. South African Music Award winners include Karen Zoid, Freshlyground, Tasha Baxter and Seether.

Uniquely African music aside, the South African music scene has, to a large extent, been characterised by bands seeking to emulate popular genres abroad. However, recent years have seen South African music begin to develop a truly original sound.

South Africa has several annual music festivals including Woodstock South Africa, MotherFudd, Oppikoppi, Rocking the Daisies and Splashy Fen. The music festivals cater to different genres and styles of music. Motherfudd is an exclusively metal festival held early in the year. The 2008 Motherfudd festival had a line-up of 30 bands with 2 stages and took place near Hartebeespoort. The Oppikoppi festival started in 1994 and is held in the Limpopo Province of South Africa, near the mining town of Northam. Originally a rock festival, Oppikoppi has expanded to include other genres. Splashy Fen is an annual Easter festival held on a farm near Underberg in KwaZulu-Natal, with a focus on rock and reggae music. Since 2016, The Legend stage at Splashy, convened by Don Clarke and Dicky Roberts has brought well known local legends back to the festival, including P J Powers in 2019.    Rocking the Daisies is an annual music festival which is held outside Cape Town in Darling on the Cloof wine estate. It was established in 2005 with a focus upon rock music and is a "green" festival for which it has garnered awards.

Skouspel is a very popular televised annual concert sponsored by the Afrikaans family-magazine Huisgenoot, hosted at the Sun City resort. Skouspel (translates as "spectacle") focuses primarily on Afrikaans music and regularly features some of the biggest names in the Afrikaans music scene along with new artists.

There is also a young movement of community rap called Tzaneen Rap, producing up-and-coming rappers that are already coming up and keeping up with the rap game. It is a good combination of vernacular Xitsonga, Sepedi, Xhosa, Zulu, Sesotho and English lyricism. It was formed in the 1990s and only became popular around 2015. There are vernacular rappers like DNP, Dj Snake and English lyrics from Ironic, Savanna and Gratitude Moruti. It all began in Limpopo, Tzaneen. South Africa has experienced a new wave of artists over the last few years, some artists include Nasty C, Blxckie, A-Reece, K.O, Timo ODV, AKA, YoungstaCPT, K.O, Anatii, and Maloon The Boom.

Although the local music scene has continued to grow exponentially since the 2000s, a lot of South Africans still consume foreign music contents over local contents.

Amapiano

In 2019, the South African music scene was introduced to a new genre of music called Amapiano, the genre is thought to be most dominant in the music industry. Amapiano can be fused with trap music and kwaito music.

The Amapiano genre has filled the void that was left by the disappearance of Kwaito in the 2000s. Amapiano is appealing to the Youth and is currently producing the most chart-topping songs in South Africa. The top 200 Shazam songs in South Africa is dominated by Amapiano tracks.

Amapiano has taken the international market by storm, with some of its top artists getting bookings from West Africa, the UK and other parts of the world. The international attention has created appropriation concerns among the local Amapiano fans, as noticed with the recent song by British artist Jorja Smith.

Neo-traditional styles
Traditionally styled music is generally appellated as "Sotho-traditional" or "Zulu-traditional", and has been an important part of the South African music business since the 1930s. Vocal and concertina records were released with a call-and-response style and a concertina used as a counterpoint to the lead vocal. Following World War 1, cheap imported concertinas arrived in South Africa, especially the Italian brand bafstari.

Sotho-traditional
The Sotho musician Tshwatlano Makala was the first traditional musician to achieve widespread commercial success. He helped to set the stage for the subsequent rise of Letsema Mat'sela's band, Basotho Dihoba, which used styles from his native Lesotho to develop a genre called mohobelo.

By the 1970s, the concertina of Sotho-traditional music was replaced with an accordion and an electric backing band. This wave of neo-traditional performers was led by Tau Ea Mat'sekha.

Zulu

The Zulu people adopted the guitar following its introduction by the Portuguese in the sixteenth century, and guitars were locally and cheaply made by the 1930s. John Bhengu was the first major Zulu guitarist, earning a reputation in 1950s Durban for his unique ukupika style of picking (as opposed to traditional strumming). Bhengu's song format, which includes an instrumental introduction (izihlabo), a melody and spoken praise (ukubonga) for a clan or family, was widely used for a long time in Zulu-traditional music. Bhengu, however, switched to the electric guitar in the late 1960s and began recording as "Phuzushukela" (Sugar Drinker). His popularity exploded, and Zulu-traditional music entered a boom.

Since the 1970s, the concertina has returned to Zulu-traditional music, while diverse influences from pop music and drum and bass were added. Vusi Ximba's Siyakudamisa (1992) was perhaps the most memorable Zulu-traditional album of the later twentieth century, and drew controversy for racy, comedic lyrics.

Tsonga-traditional
Tsonga traditional music was first recorded in the 1950s by Francisco Baloyi for Gallo, and showed a largely African style influenced by Latin rhythms. Mozambiquan musicians Fani Pfumo and Alexander Jafete became prominent studio performers in the 1950s and into the next decade. In 1975, however, Mozambique became independent and a radio station was opened by Radio Bantu, leading to the abandonment of Portuguese elements from this style.

More modern Tsonga bands, such as General MD Shirinda & the Gaza Sisters play a style called Tsonga disco, featuring a male lead vocalist backed by female singers, a guitar, keyboard or synth and disco rhythms. Thomas Chauke & the Shinyori Sisters (Tusk Records) have become probably the best-selling band of any neo-traditional style. George Maluleke na Van'wanati Sisters have also been instrumental in modernizing the music by experimenting with a faster tempo and native instruments. The most popular Tsonga musicians, however, has arguably been either Thomas Chauke, the pop singer Peta Teanet or the equally successful Penny Penny, Joe Shirimani. Paul Ndlovu is another artist who has contributed a lot in this genre, with his popular hits, Hi ta famba moyeni and Tsakane.

The modern sound of traditional Xitsonga music comprises more of the earlier native sounds that had initially been abandoned in favor of the Portuguese electronic guitars, namely the xylophone and bass marimba. Bands such as Thomas Chauke and the Xinyori Sisters and George Maluleke predominantly used guitars; however the modern sound replaces these with the xylophone or bass marimba. The Tsonga people's preference for the xylophone and marimba type of sound is inherited from the timbila music of the Chopi people, which has been entered into the UNESCO heritage archives as a Masterpiece of the Oral and Intangible Heritage of Humanity.

Pedi-traditional
Pedi-traditional music is principally harepa and is based on the harp. The German autoharp arrived in South Africa in the nineteenth century, brought by Lutheran ministers proselytising among the Pedi. Harepa has not achieved much mainstream success in South Africa, though there was a brief boom in the 1970s, led by Johannes Mohlala and Sediya dipela Mokgwadi.

Venda-traditional
Venda-traditional music was also recorded when black music in South Africa was being recognised. The late 1960s (and, more significantly the late 1970s) saw a boom in Venda-speaking artists. This was mainly influenced by the launch of a Venda radio station.

Irene Mawela (who had been singing in the 1960s and 1970s with groups like Mahotella Queens, Sweet Sixteens and the Dark City Sisters) significantly impacted traditional and contemporary Venda music, despite vocal recordings in Zulu, Sotho and Xhosa languages. Mawela's 1983 release, Khanani Yanga, was one of the most successful Venda-traditional music albums of that year. After some lean years, Mawela returned to the South African music scene with Tlhokomela Sera, released in December 2007. Mawela's recent numbers like Mme Anga Khotsi Anga and Nnditsheni are very popular. Solomon Matase is known for his hits Ntshavheni and Vho i fara Phele.

Alpheus Ramavhea, Mundalamo, Eric Mukhese, and Adziambei Band are also famous for their contributions to Venda music. The latter band still continues to produce music with great success, including a recent album release, Mutula Gole, in February 2012. Colbert Mukwevho has been involved with Venda music for over 20 years, starting with 1980s hits like "Kha tambe na thanga dzawe," "i do nela rothe" and "saga-saga." In 2006 his comeback album Mulovha namusi na matshelo, included hit songs "Ndo takala hani" and "Zwa mutani wavho" which remain popular with Venda and Pedi's. He grew up in a family of music. His father Christopher Mukwevho, then leader of the popular band Thrilling Artist, used to feature him at young age.
Rudzani Shurflus Ragimana of shurflus was well known for  known for venda reggae music together with Khakhathi and friends, Tshiganzha, Ntshenge. Reggae music is well played by a lot of artists for Tshivenda.

Other performers include: Makhadzi, Fizzy, Prifix, Bhamba, Komrade Li, SubZro, TAKZIT, Humbulani Ramagwedzha, Jahman Chiganja, Khakhathi and Friends, Maduvha Madima, Takalani Mudau, Rapson Mbilummbi Rambuwani, TMan Gavini, Clean-G, Mizo Phyll, Killah Gee, Jininka, Paul Mulaudzi, Malondo Ramulongo, Burning Doctor, Just ice, Lufuno Dagada and Tshidino Ndou.

Another singer making a name for himself in the South African music market is Tshidino Ndou, a reggae artist who is also owner of Vhadino Entertainment music company. Tshidino was born and bred in Tshakhuma, a rural village in South Africa in the Limpopo Province. So far he has two albums, Ndi do fa na inwi (2009) (Till death do us part) and Nne Ndi Nne (2010) (I am what I am). His song "Ni songo nyadza" (meaning "do not undermine other people's religions"), featuring a Venda reggae icon Humbulani Ramagwedzha of thivhulungiwi fame, is gaining extensive media exposure through Phalaphala FM, Soweto TV, Makhado FM and Univen radio.

Tshidino entered the music scene as a founder member of Vhadino House Grooves group which he established alongside his brother, Arthur Ndou in 2008. They released their debut hot album titled Ro Swika meaning we have arrived. The album contains a controversial song "Ri ya groova", widely known as "Ndo Fara Mudifho". He has released a single, "Ri khou phusha life", which has already made a mark on radios and newspapers. The full album was planned for release in 2012, featuring two other giants: Takalani Mudau of "baby fusheani" fame and the Burning Doctor of "A lu na mutwe" fame. Tshidino is not just a musician but also a prominent film producer who is more popular in the Vendawood film industry in the Limpopo Province of South Africa. He plays the character of Vho-Mulingo in Vho-Mulingo comedy.

Xhosa-traditional
Perhaps the best known neo-traditional South African music, internationally anyway, is the music of Amampondo and the solo work of their leader and founder, Dizu Plaatjies. He and his group took traditional Xhosa music from the hills of Pondoland and the Eastern Cape and put it on stage worldwide. The success of the genre was how the exponents combined their music with their stage performances and dance. The great composer Stompie Mavi, who is originally from Nqamakhwe was also very popular during the 80's and 90's. His music was inspired by Xhosa rhythms, cultural values and social commentary especially on songs such as Teba and Manyano. Musicians such as Nofinishi Dywili, Madosini, Mantombi Matotiyana and many other women have been on the forefront of traditional Xhosa music. Very recently new and younger artists such as Indwe and Gatyeni are gaining momentum.

See also
List of Afrikaans singers
List of radio stations in South Africa
List of South African musicians
Music of Namibia
Recording Industry of South Africa
South African Music Awards
Music in the movement against apartheid
Botswana

Bibliography
Allingham, Rob. "Nation of Voice". 2000. In Broughton, Simon and Ellingham, Mark with McConnachie, James and Duane, Orla (Ed.), World Music, Vol. 1: Africa, Europe and the Middle East, pp. 638–657. Rough Guides Ltd, Penguin Books. 
Mthembu-Salter, Gregory. "Spirit of Africa". 2000. In Broughton, Simon and Ellingham, Mark with McConnachie, James and Duane, Orla (Ed.), World Music, Vol. 1: Africa, Europe and the Middle East, pp. 658–659. Rough Guides Ltd, Penguin Books. 
Allingham, Rob. "Hip Kings, Hip Queens". 2000. In Broughton, Simon and Ellingham, Mark with McConnachie, James and Duane, Orla (Ed.), World Music, Vol. 1: Africa, Europe and the Middle East, pp. 660–668. Rough Guides Ltd, Penguin Books.

References

Further reading 
 Xulu, M.K., "The Re-emergence of Amahubo Songs, Styles and Ideas in Modern Zulu Musical Styles." PhD dissertation, University of Natal 1992.

External links
 BBC Radio 3 Audio (120 minutes): South Africa 1995. (Sony Radio Award Winner, 1995.) Accessed 25 November 2010.
Field recordings of traditional and neo-traditional music mainly from KwaZulu-Natal, recorded by composer Kevin Volans

 
South African culture